Twocanoes Software, Inc. is a small software company founded in 2012 and headquartered in Naperville, Illinois. The company develops and sells software and hardware, including Winclone, Smart Card Utility for MacOS, Boot Runner, and MDS.Twocanoes Software offers consulting services for MacOS and iOS software, specifically in the area of certificate-based authentication.

Products 

 Winclone – A software that clones, migrates, and restores Windows Boot Camp on MacOS.
 Smart Card Utility – An app for managing and using smart cards on MacOS.
 Push Diagnostics – A utility that manages and verifies APNs.
 Secure Remote Access – An app that is used for remotely accessing Macs with PIV smart cards.

References

External links
 

Software companies based in Illinois
Mobile software
IOS software
Windows software
MacOS software
Software companies of the United States